Janne Tuohino (born 22 May 1975) is a Finnish rally driver.

Career 
He began his rally career in 1993 when he entered a rally sprint in a Toyota Starlet. Although his first true rally was in January 1994, in which he drove a Ford Escort RS 2000. By the end of 1994 he was driving in Lancia Delta in which he competed most of his Finnish rallies. His father helped pay for the Lancia.

After receiving an international rally licence he imported an Opel Kadett from Sweden. With his newly acquired licence he entered the Finnish Rally Championship. Near the end of the championship he replaced the Kadett with an Opel Astra.

In 1997 he turned to car manufacturer Mitsubishi and purchased a Mitsubishi Lancer Evolution Mk. III. With the aid of Mitsubishi he became the Finnish Group N Champion, in 1999.

Tuohino then moved on to drive in a private Ford Escort WRC and in the end came 8th in the Rally Finland of 1999. In 2000 he had switched to Toyota and was rallying in a Corolla WRC.

In 2001 he became the Finnish Rally Champion and drove a Citroën Saxo in the Junior World Rally Championship. The final results put him 3rd in the Junior World Rally Championship since he was not always good on tarmac tracks. The next year, he placed 2nd in the Finnish Championship in a Ford Focus RS WRC 02 and took his first official World Rally Championship points.

WRC career 
In 2004 he continued to drive a Ford Focus RS WRC 03 car and, again, had a good year, scoring multiple points during the season. For 2005, he joined Škoda, and shared a drive with fellow Finn Jani Paasonen alongside team leader Armin Schwarz. However, the team folded at the end of the year, which left Tuohino without a drive for the next season.

Post-WRC 
After 2006, Tuohino has taken part in a few WRC races and has returned to race on the Finnish Rally Championship.

Complete WRC results

* Season still in progress.

JWRC Results

SWRC results

WRC-2 results

References

External links 

 Official homepage
 Statistics 
 Profile at eWRC-results.com

Finnish rally drivers
1975 births
Living people
People from Kiiminki
World Rally Championship drivers
Sportspeople from North Ostrobothnia
Citroën Racing drivers
Toksport WRT drivers
Škoda Motorsport drivers